Qarapirimli or Karapirimli or Kararpirum or Karapirili may refer to:
Qarapirimli, Agdam, Azerbaijan
Qarapirimli, Goranboy, Azerbaijan